Surattha albipunctella is a moth in the family Crambidae. It was described by Hubert Marion in 1957. It is found in Senegal.

References

Ancylolomiini
Moths described in 1957
Endemic fauna of Senegal